Louis-Théodore Devilly (28 October 1818, Metz24 December 1886, Nancy) was a French painter who specialized in military and Orientalist scenes; associated with the .

Biography 
He came from a family of booksellers. Following his father's death, his mother, Félicité Constance Gentil, took over the bookshop, but he was more attracted to drawing and sketching.

From 1833 to 1835, he attended classes taught by Laurent-Charles Maréchal, the founder of the École de Metz. He then went to Paris, where he became a student of Paul Delaroche at the École des beaux-arts de Paris. In addition to oil painting, he practiced engraving and worked with watercolors. In 1840, he exhibited at the Salon.

He returned to Metz in 1841, but continued to exhibit in Paris; winning a silver medal at the Salon of 1852. He became especially well known for his huge canvases of historical scenes; mostly battles. In 1864, he was named Director of the 

Following the Franco-Prussian War, he remained loyal to France and moved away from Metz, which had become part of the German Empire.

References

Further reading 
 Marguerite Sido, "Théodore Devilly (1818-1886), de Metz à Nancy. Biographie. Essai de catalogue raisonné "; Nancy 2 University, 2000, 356 p.
 Pierre Brasme, La Moselle et ses artistes, Éd. Serpenoise, Metz, 2002, pp. 61–63  
 Henri Claude, La Lorraine vue par les peintres, Serge Domini, Thionville, 2003, pp. 47–48, 106, 116

External links 

1818 births
1886 deaths
19th-century French painters
French history painters
French orientalists
Military art
Artists from Metz